The 1977–78 London Spartan League season was the 60th in the history of Spartan League, and the 3rd as London Spartan League. The league consisted of 32 teams.

Premier Division

The previous season Division One changed name to Premier Division before this season.
The division featured 16 teams, 12 from last season and 4 new teams, all promoted from last season's Division Two: 
 Ulysses
 Whyteleafe
 Barkingside
 Welling United

League table

Senior Division

The previous season Division Two changed name to Senior Division before this season.
The division featured 16 teams, 11 from last season and 5 new teams:
 Highfield, relegated from last season's Division One
 Hatfield Town, relegated from last season's Division One
 Virginia Water, relegated from last season's Division One
 London Borough Of Greenwich 
 Wandsworth, joined from Surrey Senior League

League table

References

1977–78
9